Joyce Harrington (November 21, 1931 – March 10, 2011) was an American writer.

She was born on November 21, 1931 in Marietta, Ohio.  She attended Marietta College and graduated with an A.B. in 1953. She died in 2011.

Awards 
Before writing her three novels, Harrington was well known for her short stories. In 1973, she won the Edgar Allan Poe award, Mystery Writers of America for her short story The Purple Shroud.

Works 
 No One Knows My Name (novel), St. Martin's (New York, NY), 1980 
 Family Reunion (novel), St. Martin's (New York, NY), 1982, 
 Dreemz of the Night (novel), St. Martin's (New York, NY), 1987

References

External links 
 Video of an Interview done in 1983.  Harrington speaks with Connie Martinson.

20th-century American novelists
20th-century American women writers
American mystery writers
Edgar Award winners
Women mystery writers
American women novelists
1931 births
2011 deaths
Marietta College alumni
People from Marietta, Ohio
21st-century American women